John F. Kennedy (1917–1963) was the president of the United States from 1961 to 1963.

John Kennedy may also refer to:

Artists and entertainers
John Kennedy (Australian musician) (born 1958), Australian musician
John Kennedy (cellist) (1922–1980), Australian musician
John Kennedy (Irish celebrity) (fl. 1968, 2009), songwriter
John Kennedy (American musician) (fl. 1987), American musician
John Kennedy (fl. 1620s), English author of the 1626 poem Calanthrop and Lucilla
John Kennedy (puppeteer) (born 1967), American puppeteer 
John Kennedy (radio broadcaster) (born 1965), British radio DJ and podcast host 
John Arthur Kennedy (1914–1990), American actor
John Kennedy Toole (1937–1969), American novelist

Athletes

Association football
John Kennedy (Brazilian footballer) (born 2002), football forward
John Kennedy (English footballer) (born 1978), footballer for Bury Town
John Kennedy (Northern Irish footballer) (born 1939), football goalkeeper
John Kennedy (Scottish footballer) (born 1983), Scottish footballer and manager

Other football
John Kennedy (Dublin Gaelic footballer) (fl. 1891–1894), Irish Gaelic footballer
John Kennedy (Canadian football) (born 1950), Canadian football player
John Kennedy Jr. (footballer) (born 1959), Australian rules footballer
John Kennedy (Gaelic footballer) (fl. 1984–2010), Gaelic football player and manager
John Kennedy Sr. (footballer) (1928–2020), Australian football player and coach

Other sports
John Kennedy (canoeist) (fl. 1970s), American canoeist
John Kennedy (cricketer) (born 1931), English cricketer
John Kennedy (cyclist) (1931–1989), British cyclist
John Kennedy (hurler) (born 1964), Irish hurler
John Kennedy (racing driver) (fl. 1970s), American racing driver
John Kennedy (rowing) (1900–1971), American coxswain
John Kennedy (shortstop) (1926–1998), American Major League Baseball player
John Kennedy (third baseman) (1941–2018), American Major League Baseball player

Politicians and public servants

United States
John Kennedy (Louisiana politician) (born 1951), United States Senator from Louisiana
John Kennedy (Pennsylvania politician) (born 1938), member of the Pennsylvania House of Representatives
John Kennedy (Utah politician) (1847–1928), Utah House of Representatives
John Alexander Kennedy (1803–1873), New York City superintendent of police
John F. Kennedy (Georgia politician) (born 1965), Georgia State Senator
John Francis Kennedy (politician) (1905–1994), Treasurer of Massachusetts
John J. Kennedy (New York State Treasurer) (c. 1857 – 1914), American businessman and politician
John J. Kennedy (political scientist), American political scientist
John L. Kennedy (1854–1946), politician and jurist
John M. Kennedy Jr. (fl. 2004–present), New York politician
John P. Kennedy (1795–1870), American politician, Secretary of the Navy and novelist
John Paul Kennedy (fl. 1966–2015), American judge
John B. Kennedy (politician) (died 1983), American city manager and politician

Other countries
John Kennedy (Manitoba politician) (1867–1927), Canadian politician
John Wilfred Kennedy (1879–1949), Canadian politician
John Kennedy (public servant) (1884–?), Australian public servant, Controller-General of the Department of Trade and Customs
John William Kennedy (born 1910), Northern Ireland politician
John Ormond Kennedy (born 1947), Victorian (Australia) politician

Soldiers
John Kennedy (Medal of Honor) (1834–1910), American soldier
John Doby Kennedy (1840–1896), general in the Confederate States Army during the American Civil War
John J. Kennedy (Republic of Texas politician) (1814–1880), soldier, lawyer and sheriff
Sir John Kennedy (British Army officer, born 1878) (1878–1948), British general
Sir John Kennedy (British Army officer, born 1893) (1893–1970), British general
John Pitt Kennedy (1796–1879), British military engineer 
John Thomas Kennedy (1885–1969), American soldier

Others
John Kennedy (1759–1842), English nurseryman, of Lee and Kennedy
John Kennedy, 2nd Lord Kennedy (before 1454–c. 1508/9), Scottish lord
John Kennedy, 5th Earl of Cassilis (1575–1615), Scottish peer
John Kennedy, 6th Earl of Cassilis (died 1668), Scottish peer
John Kennedy, 7th Earl of Cassilis (1653–1701), Scottish peer
John Kennedy, 8th Earl of Cassilis (1700–1759), Scottish peer
John Stewart Kennedy (1830–1909), Scottish-born American entrepreneur and philanthropist
John Kennedy (engineer) (1838–1921), Canadian civil engineer
John Kennedy (manufacturer) (1769–1855), Scottish-born textile manufacturer in Manchester, UK
John Kennedy (music industry executive) (born 1953), British entertainment lawyer
John Kennedy (theologian) (1813–1900), British religious leader and author
John Kennedy of Dingwall (1819–1884), Free Church of Scotland minister
John Kennedy (journalist) (1926–1994), New Zealand newspaper editor and political analyst
John B. Kennedy (journalist) (1894–1961), American journalist
John David Kennedy (born 1943), chemist and professor of inorganic chemistry at the University of Leeds, UK
John F. Kennedy Jr. (1960–1999), American political-family member and journalist, son of President John F. Kennedy
John Pendleton Kennedy (librarian) (1871–1944), first State Librarian for Virginia
J. S. Kennedy (John Stodart Kennedy, 1912–1993), British zoologist
John Gordon Kennedy (1836–1912), British diplomat
John E. Kennedy (1864–1928), Canadian-American advertising copywriter
John Fitzgerald Kennedy, man convicted of the murder of Thomas and Jackie Hawks

Fictional characters
John Kennedy (The Inbetweeners), in the 2009–2010 British sitcom

See also
Jonny Kennedy (1966–2003), British patient
Jon Kennedy (born c. 1970s), British musician
Jack Kennedy (disambiguation)
List of memorials to John F. Kennedy, list of things named after President John F. Kennedy
, list of United States sailing ships